John M Maxey (born 19 July 1958) is a male retired British rower.

Rowing career
Maxey competed in the men's coxed four event at the 1988 Summer Olympics. He represented England and won a silver medal in the eight, at the 1986 Commonwealth Games in Edinburgh, Scotland.

References

External links
 

1958 births
Living people
British male rowers
Olympic rowers of Great Britain
Rowers at the 1988 Summer Olympics
People from Royal Tunbridge Wells
Commonwealth Games medallists in rowing
Commonwealth Games silver medallists for England
Rowers at the 1986 Commonwealth Games
Medallists at the 1986 Commonwealth Games